Geraint Richard Davies (born 3 May 1960) is a British politician who is the Labour Co-op Member of Parliament (MP) for Swansea West. Previously, Davies was the Labour Party MP for Croydon Central from 1997 to 2005. He had also served as the Leader of Croydon London Borough Council.

Personal life 
Davies was born in Chester. His family comes from west Wales; his civil servant father is from Aberystwyth and his mother's family are from Swansea. He was brought up in Cardiff where he attended Llanishen High School, before studying Mathematics then Philosophy, Politics and Economics at Jesus College, Oxford; while at Oxford he was Junior Common Room President. He married Dr. Vanessa Fry in September 1991 and they now live in Swansea.

Professional background 
Davies joined Unilever as a Group Product Manager in 1982, and became Group Product Manager before joining Colgate-Palmolive Ltd. as Marketing Manager and then starting his own companies including Pure Crete Ltd. and Equity Creative Ltd. He became active in the Labour Party from 1982, being Assistant Secretary for Croydon North East Labour Party and Chair of Croydon Central Constituency Labour Party, and was a member of the Association of Scientific, Technical and Managerial Staffs, and later the Manufacturing, Science and Finance union. He has been a member of the Co-operative Party since 1984 and joined the GMB in 1985. Davies became Director of Pure Crete Ltd, described as a 'Green tour operator', in 1989.

Political career

Local government 
Davies was elected to Croydon London Borough Council in 1986 representing New Addington ward, retaining the seat in 1990 and 1994. He became Chairman of the Housing Committee when Labour won control of Croydon London Borough Council in 1994.

Davies was elected to succeed Mary Walker as Leader of the Council in 1996, resigning from the role and his council seat in 1997. He was also chair of the Housing Committee of the London Boroughs Association, the predecessor of London Councils, from 1996 to 1997.

Elections to Parliament
At the 1987 general election, Davies contested the safe Conservative seat Croydon South, coming third.  In 1992, Davies then stood in Croydon Central constituency coming second. At the 1997 general election, he stood again in Croydon Central, this time overturning the Conservative majority of 9,650 and becoming Croydon Central's MP with Labour majority of 3,897. At the 2005 election he lost his seat to the Conservative candidate Andrew Pelling by 75 votes.

Davies was subsequently selected for the Labour seat of Swansea West following the retirement of the constituency's MP of 45 years, Alan Williams. In the 2010 general election, he won with a majority of 504 and 34.7% of the vote, increasing his majority in the 2015 general election to 7036 over the Conservatives with 42.6% of the vote. In the 2017 general election his majority grew to 10,598 with a 59.8% share of the vote of 22,278, the highest Labour vote in Swansea West's history. In 2019, his vote fell to 18,493 which was 51.6% of the vote.

MP for Croydon Central
In his first term in Parliament, Davies was appointed Chair of the Environment Transport & Regions Departmental Committee and served on the Public Accounts Committee.

Re-elected in 2001, Davies was appointed NSPCC Parliamentary Ambassador in 2003 (−2005) following his proposed Regulation of Childcare Providers Bill in April 2003 which saw the law changed so that childminders were no longer permitted to smack children and parents had the right to see records of complaints about prospective childminders in respect of child safety. These provisions were subsequently adopted by the Government. He then proposed the Physical Punishment of Children (Prohibition) Bill in July 2003 which made striking children across the head, with implements or shaking them illegal. He sought to address children's issues with a Healthy Children Manifesto (June 2004) to ban junk food advertising to children and regulate food labeling (adopted by Government 11/06) and a School Meals and Nutrition Bill in January 2005 that sought to include nutrition in OFSTED and to ban unhealthy vending (provisions adopted 3/05 & 10/05). 

He also sponsored the Regulation of Hormone Disrupting Chemicals Bill (May 2004) to impose precautionary bans on chemicals with evidence of being dangerous. This bill was incorporated in the EU REACH directive 09/06 and supported by the World Wide Fund for Nature UK. He was also involved in a high-profile campaign for the release of British detainees being held at Guantanamo Bay. Feroz Abbasi and Moazzam Begg were finally released on 25 January 2005.

MP for Swansea West

Private Members' Bills

Davies has introduced twenty-six Private Members' Bills since becoming MP for Swansea West in 2010.

On his re-election for Swansea West in 2010, Davies became the first newly elected MP to present a Private Members' Bill – The Credit Regulation (Child Pornography) Bill in July 2010 that received national media coverage and cross-party support including an Early Day Motion signed by 203 MPs. The Bill penalises credit and debit card companies for facilitating the downloading of child abuse images and requires that pre-paid credit cards below £100 are only issued when the identity of those buying them is recorded in order to trace their source if used for illegal downloading or underaged purchases of weapons or alcohol.

His Multinational Motor Manufacturing Companies (Duty of Care to Former Employees) Bill 2012–13 was designed to ensure that former Ford Motor Company employees, including those from Swansea, who were transferred to an arms-length company called Visteon that Ford created, were compensated for the under-funding of their pension fund. This helped to secure the £29 million pay out in 2014 by Ford to former employees after a five-year campaign supported by an all-party group of MPs for which Davies was Labour lead.

Davies' Counsellors and Psychotherapists (Regulation) Bill 2013–14 was designed to ensure that patients were treated by qualified practitioners using evidence based treatment. It explicitly seeks to ban conversion therapy, sexual grooming or activity with patients by practitioners. Davies is in the process of updating the Bill which will include clearer safeguards for Trans people when it is published in 2019.

Davies' Sugar in Food and Drinks (Targets, Labelling and Advertising) Bill 2014–15 aims to help curb the obesity and diabetes epidemics by requiring food labeling to express added sugar content in teaspoonfuls, restricting high sugar products as presenting themselves as low fat in advertising and requiring the Secretary of State for Health to set annual targets for sugar content by food category recommended by the Food Standards Agency. The Bill was reintroduced to Parliament in September 2016 and subsequently published.

Following publicity of Davies' Bill (10 September 2014) to criminalise the distribution of sexually explicit images without consent on the internet (known as revenge porn), the Justice Secretary has announced that revenge porn will be criminalised.

In October 2014, he proposed a Bill to prohibit the advertising of electronic cigarettes and to prohibit their sale to children

Davies' International Trade Agreement Scrutiny Bill would require scrutiny of, and enable amendments to, international trade agreements, including the Transatlantic Trade and Investment Partnership (the proposed EU–US free trade deal) and the Investor State Dispute Settlements (which threatens to give multi-national companies the power to sue governments for laws they pass which protect consumers or workers and thereby affect future profit streams), by the European and UK Parliaments. Davies asked the Prime Minister to support his Bill in the House of Commons on the day it was presented on 27 October 2014 and David Cameron responded: "there's an awful lot of scare stories going round and this greater scrutiny can lay some of those to rest". The Bill was reintroduced to Parliament in 2016 following a Commons debate in December 2015. Since then, Geraint has become Rapporteur for TTIP on the Council of Europe.

In December 2015, Davies published his Fracking (Measurement and Regulation of Impacts) (Air, Water and Greenhouse Gas Emissions) Bill, calling for strict limits on water contamination and fugitive methane emissions.

In June 2016, following the EU referendum, Davies presented his Terms of Withdrawal from the EU (Referendum) Bill to Parliament, which pioneered calls for a Public Vote on the UK's Exit Package from the EU with the default of the UK remaining a member of the EU if the Deal is rejected. The Bill was presented again in 2017 and re-presented in 2019 and pre-dates the "People's Vote Campaign" or support from other political parties.

In January 2019, Davies presented and published the European Union Revocation of Notification of Withdrawal Bill which ruled out a No-Deal Exit from the EU by requiring Article 50 to be revoked unless an EU Exit Deal is both approved by Parliament and a Public Vote.

60 years after the Clean Air Act, Davies introduced the Clean Air Bill to curb emissions and develop sustainable transport systems by road, rail air and sea. This included air quality targets, vehicle testing reflecting on-road conditions, air pollution measurement and warnings, powers to restrict and ban diesel vehicles in urban centres, a national infrastructure of electric and hydrogen filling points and a fiscal strategy to incentivise consumers and producers towards cleaner vehicles.
Davies has redrafted and submitted a Clean Air Bill in 2017, in which he also incorporates measures to reduce indoor air pollution caused by chemicals at home and in public spaces at work, schools or in hospitals.

Davies also published his Plastics Bill in 2017 that calls for the government to set and enforce ambitious targets that would reduce the amount of plastic produced and also ensure that the producer pays for the recycling of plastic products through an extended producer responsibility plan. The Bill gives an external agency the powers to set and enforce those targets and calls the government to adopt a fiscal strategy (including a plastic bottle levy alongside a refill scheme) to reduce plastic production and consumption, encourage more easily recycled plastics and require universal re-cyclability and the development of sustainable materials.

Select Committees 
Geraint Davies sits on two select committees: the Welsh Affairs Committee and Environment, Food and Rural Affairs Committee.

He precious has also previously sat on select committees; the Environmental Audit Committee, and the European Scrutiny Committee. He also sits on the Panel of Chairs, and regularly chairs Westminster Hall debates in Parliament.

Davies has called for the banning of fracking in the UK, cleaner air in urban centres, and for EU environmental legislation to continue in the event of the UK exiting the European Union.

As a member of the European Scrutiny Committee, Davies has addressed ministers on subjects including the Transatlantic Trade and Investment Partnership (TTIP), the Comprehensive Economic Trade Agreement (CETA), and the 2016 referendum on the UK's membership of the European Union.

APPGs 
Geraint Davies chairs the APPG on Air pollution (2016–present) and the APPG for Speech and Language Difficulties (2017–present). and the APPG on Democracy and the Constitution (2021-present); plus he is also Vice Chair of several others.

The APPG for Speech and Language Difficulties attempts to raise awareness about the difficulties facing those who have communication needs and encourages early intervention and treatment for SLCN. The APPG for Air Pollution promotes measures to improve air quality in the UK and organizes research to raise awareness about the impact of unclean air. It has published a report on Air Quality Strategy to Reduce Coronavirus Infection and a report on Pollution from Waste Incineration

Parliamentary Assembly of the Council of Europe (PACE) 
Davies served as a member of the Council of Europe 2010–2018 and 2019-present. He continues to be a member of the Social Affairs, Public Health and Environment Committee. He was elected as the Rapporteur to prepare PACE reports on Safeguarding democracy, rights and the environment
in international trade and the Exploration and The exploration and exploitation of non-conventional hydrocarbons in Europe) (fracking), New Generation Trade Agreements (TTIP and CETA)), Trade and Air Pollution.
 
His report on fracking was agreed by PACE and adopted by the newly elected Macron government to ban fracking in France.

His report on New Generation Trade Agreements opposed the Investor State Dispute Settlement (ISDS) system, which empowers transnational corporations to sue governments for lost profits from new laws to protect public health and the environment. It judged ISDS as unnecessary for trade deals between mature democracies and economies which have established legal systems to protect investors and balance this alongside the public interest. The report was instrumental in replacing ISDS with the more democratically accountable Investor Court System (ICS) in the EU-Canada free trade agreement CETA (Comprehensive Economic Trading Area).

Expenses and Wikipedia
For the year 2004–05, Davies' MP costs, including staff and offices in Parliament and his constituency, were the highest in the country. Davies said "this shows I was one of the most hard-working MPs in Britain." According to the Daily Telegraph this included over £4,000 on a central London flat 12 miles from his consistency home and taxi expenses he should not have been entitled to claim because of his second home. He also spent £38,750 on postage which he claimed were the result of the Croydon Central constituency being virtually the biggest and, due to the Lunar House Home Office Immigration Department, arguably the busiest in the UK. "Somebody has got to do the most work. I am proud it was me," he said. Davies repaid £156 used to post his annual report calendars by prepaid envelopes instead of stamps. Davies spent £2,285 on his kitchen and £1,500 on his living room at the taxpayers' expense.

The Wikipedia article about him was one of a number edited ahead of the 2015 general election by computers inside Parliament, an act which the Daily Telegraph says "appears to be a deliberate attempt to hide embarrassing information from the electorate." In Davies's case, the information deleted related to his expenses.

In November 2021, The Independent revealed that Davies is one of 16 MPs who claimed expenses to cover their residential rent payments despite letting out their own properties in London. In Davies' case, he claimed £67,000 in taxpayer funding to rent a home between November 2017 and April 2021 while collecting rental payments from a home he owns in the capital.

Views
Davies favoured a second referendum over Brexit. Davies wrote, "To make Jeremy Corbyn prime minister next year, Labour must back a public vote on the EU deal. The alternative is no deal, which would trigger a hard Brexit inflicted by a right-wing Tory prime minister between 2019 and 2022. (...) The chaos of a no-deal Brexit – with food and medicine shortages – will require emergency measures to keep lorries and planes moving. Shrinking economic activity and trade will require a squeeze on "expensive" environmental standards and rights at work. So, soon we may all be flying on board Jacob Rees-Mogg's time machine back to Charles Dickens' Britain." In the series of Parliamentary votes on Brexit in March 2019, Davies voted against the Labour Party whip and in favour of an amendment tabled by members of The Independent Group for a second public vote.

References

External links

Geraint Davies MP Welsh Labour Party profile

Living people
Alumni of Jesus College, Oxford
Politics of the London Borough of Croydon
Councillors in the London Borough of Croydon
Labour Co-operative MPs for English constituencies
Labour Co-operative MPs for Welsh constituencies
UK MPs 1997–2001
UK MPs 2001–2005
UK MPs 2010–2015
UK MPs 2015–2017
UK MPs 2017–2019
UK MPs 2019–present
People educated at Llanishen High School
Members of the Parliament of the United Kingdom for Swansea constituencies
Labour Party (UK) councillors
1960 births
Leaders of local authorities of England
Unilever people